There are sometimes said to be more than 200 neighborhoods in Chicago, though residents differ on their names and boundaries. A city ordinance prescribing and mapping 178 neighborhoods is almost unknown and ignored even by municipal departments. Neighborhood names and identities have evolved due to real estate development and changing demographics. The City of Chicago is also divided into 77 community areas which were drawn by University of Chicago researchers in the late 1920s. Chicago's community areas are well-defined, generally contain multiple neighborhoods, and depending on the neighborhood, less commonly used by residents. More historical images of Chicago neighborhoods can be found in Explore Chicago Collections, a digital repository made available by Chicago Collections archives, libraries and other cultural institutions in the city.

List of neighborhoods by community area

See also

 Community areas in Chicago

References

External links

 City of Chicago Website
 Community Areas Map, January 2017
 Community Maps
 Interactive Chicago Neighborhood Map
 
 Chicago Neighborhood Research Guide at the Newberry Library

 
Chicago-related lists
Chicago
Chicago